Ellinor Davenport Adams (birth registered in the fourth quarter of 185811 April 1913) was a British journalist and author. She wrote mainly girls’ fiction, and told her stories from the child's perspective.

Biography
Ellinor Davenport Adams had her birth registered in the fourth quarter of 1856. She was the third surviving child, and second surviving daughter of William Henry Davenport Adams (5 May 182830 December 1891), a journalist and author, and Sarah Esther Morgan (13 August 18351908), the daughter of shoemaker Timothy Morgan. The couple had married at St. Mary's Church in the Parish of Paddington, London on 26 December 1850.

The family as a whole were quite involved in literature and drama. Her father had over 100 books to his credit, and her eldest brother, William Davenport Adams (28 December 185126 July 1904) was a noted journalist and author. Her elder sister, Florence Mary Susan Ballingall (4th quarter 18554th quarter 1943) was also a journalist and writer, who wrote children's one-act plays, mainly about fairies. Her brother Alfred Elliot (later Davenport) Adams (1st quarter 18611947) became an actor,, and married an actress.

It is not clear what education Adams received. The census returns show no governess living in the household. Her father was himself a schoolteacher and a family tutor and may have instructed his daughters while working as an editor and generating his prolific literary output. Her father had a large library of standard works and Adams was reading these at the age when most children are reading story books. The plot of her first book concerns a nine-year-old girl who is sent to a day-school run by a retired colonel and his sister, Colonel Russell's Baby 1889. The heroine was called Lily with a father who edited a provincial newspaper, like Ellinor herself, and who does not have the time to educate her.

Adams lived with her sister Florence her whole life. Although Florence had married in 1877, the 1881 census, only four years later, showed her living with Adams, her parents, and her younger brother at Victoria Road, Solihull, Birmingham. The 1891 census found Adams and Florence living with their parents at 46 Alexandra Road in Wimbledon, London, the address at which her father died on 30 December 1891.

Both Adams and Florence gave their profession or occupation as "Literary" in the 1891 census. By 1901 Adams was living with her widowed mother and Florence, also a widow, at 67 Chelverton Road in Putney, London, where she gave her profession or occupation as "Author". Adams was still living at 67 Chelverton road with Florence at the time of the 1911 census, both now giving their profession or occupation as "Journalism and Literature".

Adams's seems to have published no new books after 1902. This may have been because she took her brother's literary reviewing work at the Globe after his death in 1904, and her work for Blackie and Son, which continued up to her death. Her mother died in 1908, leaving Adams and her sister alone in the house with one servant. Adams's health gradually declined and she died at home on 11 April 1913. Her death certificate records that she had suffered from chronic bronchial asthma for many years, and that after suffering for 14 days from pleurisy, she lost consciousness and died. She was buried in Putney Vale Cemetery on 16 April 1913.

Work
Adams's first published work in a book appears to be her story  Wild Raspberries: a tale of love and adventure which was one of five stories in St. Quentin's, a village tale published by the Edinburgh Publishing Company, Edinburgh, 1828, and other stories, by Gertrude Douglas and others. Adams was 27 at the time. Her first long story of girls, Colonel Russell's Baby was published in 1889, but her obituary notes that she wrote the story in her girlhood.

She had long worked with her brother William Davenport Adams, who was on the editorial staff at "The Globe" in his work as a literature reviewer, and took over from him after his death, holding the post for several years.

Ellinor wrote girls' stories mostly. Most of her later stories were published by Blackie and Son for whom she acted as a publisher's reader. Several of her later books were graduated readers for use in schools.

Books
The following list of works has been drawn mainly from a search on the Jisc Library Hub Discover website, supplemented by searches for confirmation of details or for any missing details at the British Library, WorldCat, and in the British Newspaper Archive. Adams also wrote serial stories, not all of which seem to have been published in book form. In particular The Wonder Workers the story of a household of girls who go to London to make their fortunes began as a serial in The Girl's Own Paper in May 1903..

Example of illustrations for a book by Adams

Kenneth Mathiason Skeaping (13 December 185616 May 1946), a lithographer, portrait painter, and illustrator,  illustrated A Holiday Prize with 35 illustrations, shown below, plus a decorative title page, decorative heading bands for each chapter, and silhouettes for each end of chapter.The Gentlewoman said that The Holiday Prize, already a bright and imaginative tale, was "still further enhanced by the artistic illustrations" of Skeaping.

Assessment
Sims and Clare state that Adams "typifies the turn-of-the-century girls’ writer in many ways" and that her books "are half-way between the Victorian tale which sought to provide moral edification and its successor which hid the pill in a very heavy coating of sugar." 
Her obituary  states that Adams "had a strong sympathy with children" and "understood the needs of girls", which enabled here to given to every story a definite plot and real characters.

Sims and Clare state that Adams's treatment of children who have been warped or stunted by neglect on the part of their adult carers is particularly interesting. Many of her books are written from the perspective of the child protagonists. Her first published novel Colonel Russell's Baby is told from the perspective of a girl, who is nine at the start of the story, and is a study of her character, "unsparingly minute in its method". In her case, her mother has died and her father has little time for her, and she suffers at the hands of her Latin master. Robin's Ride is again told from the point of view of the youthful protagonist. Repeatedly, reviewers noted that Adams has a "close knowledge of youthful character and habits", or that her work shows "much knowledge of child life and character". Sims and Clare call her characterisation of two sisters in On Honour, who have been badly brought up by a mean and selfish aunt, "moving and credible".  Little Miss Conceit was an "excellent study of child character", where again a child is forced into a role for which she is ill-prepared. In A Queen among Girls the heroine defends her weakly brother from the unfair judgement of her uncle.

Although some of Adams's older heroines aspire to be "new girls" in the sense advocated by Alice Corkran in her editorial of early 1899 in The Girl's Realm, or as described by Sally Mitchell in her landmark 1991 study The New Girl: Girl's Culture in England 1880-1915 they are more firmly wedded to being "nice girls". This is demonstrated by Augusta in A Queen among Girls who abandons her dreams of a professional career, which a reviewer characterises as "selfish dreams", to protect her sickly younger brother from his overbearing uncle, thus exchanging the role of "nice girl" for that of "new girl". In Miss Secretary Ethel Adams make the contrast between "new girls" and "nice girls" all the more obvious in the character of the Girton feminist, quite clearly a "new girl" who is contrasted with the heroine. In this case, the "new girl" of an efficient secretary is replaced by the "nice girl" as she is adopted by her former employer and his wife.

Notes

References

External links
 

1858 births
1913 deaths
19th-century British writers
20th-century British writers
British children's writers
British women writers